The 2007 season was the Big Ten Conference's 112th overall. For the second straight year, Ohio State won the conference title and advanced to the national championship game.

Bowl games

All-Big Ten selections

Offense

Statistical leaders

Awards
Bednarik Award
 LB Dan Connor, Penn State

Butkus Award
 LB James Laurinaitis, Ohio State

Bobby Dodd Coach of the Year Award
 Coach Lloyd Carr, Michigan

Liberty Mutual Coach of the Year Award
 Coach Ron Zook, Illinois

Broyles Award
 Assistant coach Jim Heacock, Ohio State

References